Maurizio Colasanti is an Italian conductor.

Biography 
Colasanti specializes in contemporary music, more specifically in the opera and classic romantic period.  He has worked with such distinguished artists as A.Pay, B.Canino, B.Incagnoli, A. Rosand, C. M. Giulini  M. Larrieu, P.Badura Skoda and I Solisti, as well as being featured in national broadcasts by RAI and Radio TRE.  In 2012, he was named Artistic Director and Principal Conductor of the OSUEL Symphony Orchestra.
In 2013, he won the Giuseppe Dell’Orefice Prize, a fledgling classical music honour established by the Giuseppe Dell’Orefice association and Fara Filiorum Petri Municipality.

Orchestra 
He has conducted:
 Orchestra Sinfonica Siciliana of Palermo
 Capella Istropolitana of Bratislava
 Mar del Plata Symphony Orchestra
 Ceará Philharmonic Orchestra
 Porto Alegre Symphony Orchestra
 Orquesta Sinfónica del Estado de México
 Guanajuato Symphony Orchestra
 Orchestra da Camera Fiorentina
 Kaunas Symphony Orchestra
 Adana Symphony Orchestra
 Lithuanian Chamber Orchestra
 I Solisti del Teatro alla Scala di Milano
 Orchestra del Teatro Marrucino
 Orchestra della Magna Grecia
 Villa-Lobos Symphony Orchestra
 New York New England Symphony Orchestra
 Quito Symphony Orchestra
 Heidelberg Symphony Orchestra
 Wien Residenz Orchestra
 Londrina OSUEL
 Chicago ISU
 Klagenfurt Karnten Sinfonie Orkester
 Seoul SSO

Discography 
Label: Aulia, Mondo Musica verlag, Bongiovanni:
W.A. Mozart, Divertimenti, I Fiati Italiani AA690131
W.A. Mozart, Masonic Music AA 690070
F. Danzi, Quintetti, AA690117
F.V.Krommer, L.Kotzeluch, A.Rosetti  I Solisti della Scala
Maurizio Colasanti conductor
J. Triebensee, Triebensee'',AA69005 I Fiati Italiani, Maurizio Colasanti conduct.

External links 
News 
Web Site 
Interview 
Conference 
Reviews 

1966 births
Living people
People from Chieti
Italian male conductors (music)
Italian composers
Italian male composers
Music directors (opera)
21st-century Italian conductors (music)
21st-century Italian male musicians